Murder in St. John's Wood is a 1934 detective novel  by E.C.R. Lorac, the pen name of the British writer Edith Caroline Rivett. It is the sixth book featuring Chief Inspector MacDonald of Scotland Yard who appeared in a lengthy series of novels during the Golden Age of Detective Fiction.

Synopsis
When millionaire Hilary Vanbrugh is found shot dead in the summer house of the garden of his residence in St John's Wood, it appears to be suicide. However Vanbrugh had so many enemies and certain inconsistencies in the manner of death leads to MacDonald being appointed to the case.

References

Bibliography
 Cooper, John & Pike, B.A. Artists in Crime: An Illustrated Survey of Crime Fiction First Edition Dustwrappers, 1920-1970. Scolar Press, 1995.
 Hubin, Allen J. Crime Fiction, 1749-1980: A Comprehensive Bibliography. Garland Publishing, 1984.
 Nichols, Victoria & Thompson, Susan. Silk Stalkings: More Women Write of Murder. Scarecrow Press, 1998.
 Reilly, John M. Twentieth Century Crime & Mystery Writers. Springer, 2015.

1934 British novels
British mystery novels
Novels by E.C.R. Lorac
Novels set in London
British detective novels
St John's Wood
Sampson Low books